Ernest Ferny (1886–1939) was a Swiss film actor.

Selected filmography
 Tarakanova (1930)
 Moscow Nights (1934)
 The Lady of Lebanon (1934)
 Light Cavalry (1935)
 Taras Bulba (1936)
 The Red Dancer (1937)
 The Silent Battle (1937)
 Street of Shadows (1937)
 The Messenger (1937)
 The Patriot (1938)
 Stolen Life (1939)

References

Bibliography
 Goble, Alan. The Complete Index to Literary Sources in Film. Walter de Gruyter, 1999.

External links

1886 births
1939 deaths
Swiss male film actors
Actors from Geneva